Taylor McKimens (born 1976) is an artist based in New York. His work is informed largely by his childhood in Winterhaven, California, and life in the small town on the Mexican border.

McKimens was born in Seattle, Washington. He received his BFA from Art Center College of Design in Pasadena, California in 1999. He "has been known for years as a painter of “American Life”, making large and narrative paintings that feature rural tableaux, economically marginalized people, overlooked and often beautiful details of the natural world and cultural debris." "McKimens' style of line drawing reminds of printing techniques." "Like many today, he learned to draw from comic books, video games, and illustrations on cereal boxes." His "textured abstractions draw from Southwestern influences and color palettes while the heads pull from McKimens’ pop culture roots and take on McKimens' signature comic book quality."

He has held solo exhibitions at the Watari Museum of Contemporary Art in Tokyo, Deitch Projects, Art Rock at Rockefeller Center and The Hole in New York, Studio Raffaelli in Trento, Dio Horia in Mykonos, Loyal Gallery in Stockholm, Galerie Zurcher in Paris and Annet Gelink in Amsterdam. His work was included in Panic Room: Selections from the Dakis Joannou Collection in Athens, New York Minute at MACRO Museum in Rome and The Garage Museum of Contemporary Art in Moscow, Greater New York at MoMA PS1 as well as numerous other exhibitions in museums and galleries internationally.

"In 2015, McKimens was commissioned by the Republic of San Marino to paint a portrait of their founding patron, Saint Marinus"

He was commissioned by the National Audubon Society to paint a mural for the Audubon Mural Project in Harlem, New York.

McKimens has curated exhibitions including "Stranger Town" at Dinter Fine Art, New York in 2005, and "HETA-UMA & Underground Summit Japan/USA" at On Sundays in the Watari Museum of Contemporary Art, Tokyo.

References

1976 births
Living people
Winterhaven, California
American contemporary artists
Artists from New York City
Artists from California
Art Center College of Design alumni